"Big Bad Bill (Is Sweet William Now)" is a song with music by Milton Ager and lyrics by Jack Yellen, written in 1924. The song became a vocal hit for Margaret Young accompanied by Rube Bloom, and an instrumental hit for the Don Clark Orchestra.

The song has also been recorded by Ernest Hare (1924), Billy Murray (1924), Clementine Smith (1924), Emmett Miller (1929), Glen Gray and the Casa Loma Orchestra (1940), Peggy Lee (1962), Merle Haggard (1973), Ry Cooder (1978), Leon Redbone (1978), Van Halen (1982) and others and has been a popular song in barbershop quartet and chorus competitions.

The lyrics describe a man "in the town of Louisville..." who was once a fearsome and rough character known for getting into fights, who, after getting married, becomes a peaceable person who devotes his time to domestic activities such as washing dishes and mopping the floor. He was "Stronger than Samson I declare, Til the brown skinned woman, Bobbed his hair."

Recordings
 Billy Murray (1924) Victor Talking Machine Company: 19503-A
 Emmett Miller (1929) accompanied by his Georgia Crackers. Okeh: 41305
 Sugar 'n' Spice (1962) Peggy Lee
 I Love Dixie Blues (1973) Merle Haggard
 Balladtown USA presents 30 Years of Barbershop Harmony (1975) Various / The Lions Share
 Jazz (1978) Ry Cooder (opening track)
 Champagne Charlie (1978) Leon Redbone
 Diver Down (1982) Van Halen
 Bursting With Pride, Pride of Baltimore Chorus
 2009 International Barbershop Harmony Society Quartet Contest, Vol. 1 (2009) Various / The  Harmonious Hunks

In film
William Kunstler: Disturbing the Universe (2009), sung by Sam Amidon and Shahzad Ismaily during the credits
Boardwalk Empire, Season 2

References

External links

1924 songs
Songs written by Jack Yellen
Van Halen songs
Songs with music by Milton Ager